Taenitis is a genus of ferns in the subfamily Pteridoideae of the family Pteridaceae. Species are native to south-east tropical Asia, Australia and the Pacific.

Species
, Plants of the World Online and the Checklist of Ferns and Lycophytes of the World recognized the following species:

Taenitis blechnoides (Willd.) Sw.
Taenitis brooksii Copel.
Taenitis cordata (Gaudich.) Holttum
Taenitis dimorpha Holttum
Taenitis diversifolia Holttum
Taenitis flabellivenia (Baker) Holttum
Taenitis hookeri (C.Chr.) Holttum
Taenitis hosei (Baker) Holttum
Taenitis intermedia M.Kato
Taenitis interrupta Hook. & Grev.
Taenitis marginata Holttum
Taenitis mediosora M.Kato
Taenitis obtusa Hook.
Taenitis pinnata (J.Sm.) Holttum
Taenitis requiniana (Gaudich.) Copel.
Taenitis trilobata Holttum
Taenitis vittarioides Holttum

References

Pteridaceae
Fern genera